The Christ of the Mercy is a colossal statue of Jesus Christ in the city of San Juan del Sur, Nicaragua, to a height of 134m above sea level  . The statue is located high above the northernmost seawall in the bay of San Juan. At the foot of the statue is a small chapel. Information:
Inside the chapel, the full name of the work is provided, along with text dating the construction to 2009. As of January of 2017, the entrance fee is $2 for foreigners and $1 for Nicaraguan nationals.

See also
 List of statues of Jesus
Monumento al Divino Salvador del Mundo, Monument to the Savior of the World San Salvador City, El Salvador
Cristo Redentore, Christ the Redeemer of Maratea, Italy
Christ of Vung Tau in Vietnam (32 m)
Christ Blessing in Manado, North Sulawesi, Indonesia (30 m)
Cristo-Rei in Portugal: a  monument of Christ the Redeemer
Cristo Rei of Dili, a  statue in Dili, Timor-Leste
Cerro del Cubilete in Guanajuato, Mexico: a  statue inspired by Christ the Redeemer
Cristo Rey in Ejutla, Jalisco, inspired by the Rio de Janeiro statue
Christ of the Ozarks in Arkansas, United States: a  statue inspired by Christ the Redeemer
Christ of Havana in Havana, Cuba: a  statue inspired by Christ the Redeemer
Christ the Redeemer of the Andes (Argentina/Chile)
Cristo de la Concordia in Cochabamba, Bolivia
Cristo de las Noas in Torreón, Mexico
Christ of the Abyss in various underwater locations

External links 
 El Nuevo Diario
 Viajeros

Videos
 San Juan del Sur en Semana Santa 2010
 Cristo de la Divina Misericordia
 San Juan del Sur

Mountain monuments and memorials
Colossal statues of Jesus
Concrete sculptures in Nicaragua
Art Deco sculptures and memorials
2009 sculptures
Cultural infrastructure completed in 2009
Christianity in Nicaragua